The 1984 Estonian SSR Football Championship was won by Jõhvi Estonia Kaevandus.

League table

References

Estonian Football Championship
Est
Football